The Brahmaputra Mail train bombing was a terrorist attack on a train travelling in Western Assam in Eastern India on 30 December 1996. The bomb totally wrecked three carriages of the train and derailed six more, killing at least 33 people.

The bomb was of unknown composition, and had been left next to a line of track between Kokrajhar and Fakiragram stations. It is likely the bomb was detonated by a remote control device, and timed to cause maximum destruction, as the Brahmaputra Mail passenger service to New Delhi came past at high speed. 

Official reports claimed that 33 people were killed in the explosion, but the remote region in which the blast occurred and government desires to minimize the impact of the attack has led some commentators to question this figure. Some have claimed that 100 fatalities is a more likely figure.

The Indian government blamed the attack on a local separatist organisation, the Bodo Security Force, and although they have not admitted guilt.

See also
 List of terrorist incidents, 1996
2014 Chennai train bombing
2006 Mumbai train bombings
Jnaneswari Express train derailment
List of railway accidents and incidents in India

References

External links
Short piece on the bombing

Explosions in 1996
Mass murder in 1996
Railway accidents in 1996
Terrorist incidents in India in 1996
December 1996 events in Asia
December 1996 crimes
1990s in Assam
Terrorism in Assam
Gowda administration 
Train bombings in Asia
Improvised explosive device bombings in India
Railway accidents and incidents in Assam
Rail transport in Assam